Adrishtam is a 1939 Indian Tamil-language film S. D. S. Yogi. The film stars T. Suryakumari, K. R. Chellam, V. V. Satagopan and M. N. Srinivasan.

Plot 
A young heiress is kidnapped over property disputes, and circumstances force her to begin the streets of Madras. A lady lawyer later fights for her and such events.

Cast 
 T. Suryakumari as the heiress
 K. R. Chellam as the lawyer
 V. V. Satagopan as the lawyer's husband
 M. N. Srinivasan

Production 
Adrishtam was written and directed by S. D. S. Yogi, and produced under Mayura Films. Parts of the song "Ayya Siru Penn", composed by the Sarma Brothers, written by Yogi and sung by Suryakumari, were filmed at the now non-existent Moore Market in Madras.

Release and reception 
Adrishtam was released in 1939. According to historian Randor Guy, the Censor Board edited out many scenes such as those where Chellam's lawyer character asks a woman in court "highly embarrassing and intimate" questions, thereby "damaging the film" in the process. Despite this, the film was well received by audiences, and Suryakumari became a household name in Tamil through this film along with Vipra Narayana and Ambikapathy (both 1937).

References

External links 
 

1930s Tamil-language films
1939 drama films
1939 films
Indian black-and-white films
Indian drama films